Ashley Hall is a private school for girls located in downtown Charleston, South Carolina, United States for students in pre-kindergarten-grade 12. It was founded in 1909 by Mary Vardrine McBee, who headed the institution for many years. It is the only all-girls' independent private school in South Carolina.

Ashley Hall enrolls girls 2 years to grade 12 with a coeducational preschool. For the 2019-2020 school year, Ashley Hall enrolled 640 students. The school motto is Possunt Quae Volunt, or "Girls who have the will have the ability."

Ashley Hall's campus features three historic properties: James Nicholson House (McBee House), 172 Rutledge Avenue (c.1816-1820), Warren Street House, 89 Warren Street (c.1823), The Elizabeth Rivers Lewine ’54 House for Global Studies, 79 Rutledge Avenue (c.1876)

History
In the spring of 1909, Mary Vardrine McBee bought the James Nicholson House at 172 Rutledge Avenue to found an independent college preparatory school for girls. She named the school Ashley Hall. During her forty-year tenure, the school grew from just 46 students in grades 10–12 to a much larger student body in Lower, Middle and Upper schools.

McBee set the tone for the school – holding it to the highest academic standards, establishing the Alumnae Association, instilling many of the traditions that still exist today, and acquiring facilities that would serve as the foundation for the institution for years to come. Her school included the McBee House (now so named) and surrounding grounds, an indoor swimming pool, the "Old Gym" (Burges auditorium), kitchen and dining room, the Headmistress House and faculty apartments across the street from Ashley Hall.

In 1948, in order for the school to continue to operate as a non-profit institution under a Board of Trustees, the Ashley Hall Foundation was established. The Foundation purchased Ashley Hall from McBee in 1949, the year of her retirement. The Foundation's first move was to appoint William Piper as Head of School. He served as Head from 1949 to 1954. He was an acknowledged fiscal expert and helped put the school in good economic standing.

Caroline Pardue joined Ashley Hall in 1950 as the Academic Head of the Upper School and teacher of history. She was appointed Headmistress in 1954 and continued to serve in that capacity for the next 25 years until 1978. Her many accomplishments include the establishment of Pardue, Lane and Jenkins Halls to officially house Lower, Middle and Upper school classrooms, the construction of Davies Auditorium, and the incorporation of a kindergarten for boys and girls. It was also during her leadership that the school shifted its student base, eliminating boarding opportunities to focus on providing local students with a superior education. In 1976 the school graduated its first African-American student. Upon Pardue's retirement, Marian Bell Leland assumed the role of Headmistress from 1979 to 1984. Leland was instrumental in and created the Capital Campaign, the Ashley Hall Fund, which funded the construction of the school's gymnasium.

Margaret C. MacDonald led Ashley Hall from 1985 to 2004. She is credited for elevating the school's academic standards, expanding programs, and educating both her faculty and the community on the value of an education that addressed the specific learning needs of girls and young women. She established financial aid programs and additional scholarships, initiated the school's first campus master plan, developed teaching excellence awards, the aquatics and admissions departments, and added to the physical property of the school. MacDonald, along with the school's Board of Trustees, also helped create the 2003–2008 Strategic Plan. This comprehensive blueprint outlines the future goals of the school as they relate to academics, student and faculty recruitment and facilities enhancements.

School publications 

Student publications
 Spiral – school yearbook
 Acanthus – Upper School literary magazine

Development publications
 Perspectives – official school magazine, distributed to all alumni, families, students and faculty

Athletics 
Ashley Hall participates in the South Carolina Independent School Association (SCISA).

The school is famed for its excellent varsity volleyball and tennis teams.

It has rivalries with Porter-Gaud School and Bishop England High School.

 Fall sports:
Cross country (SCISA Class AAA State Champions 2010, 2015, 2016, and 2020)
Golf
Swimming
Tennis (SCISA Class AAA State Champions 2016, 2018, 2019, and 2020)
Volleyball (SCISA Class AAA State Champions 2007, 2008, 2009, 2018)
 Winter sports:
Basketball
 Spring sports: 
Archery
Sailing
Soccer
Lacrosse
Equestrian
Track (SCISA Class AAA State Champions 2013, 2014)

Notable alumnae
Madeleine L'Engle (Class of 1936), author
Barbara Bush (Class of 1943, née Pierce), former First Lady
Nancy Stevenson (Class of 1945, née Backer), Lieutenant Governor of South Carolina
Nancy Friday (Class of 1951), author
Alexandra Ripley (Class of 1951, née Braid), author
Harriet McDougal Rigney (Class of 1956, née Popham), editor
Josephine Humphreys (Class of 1963), author
D'Anna Fortunato (Class of 1963), mezzo-soprano
Martha Rivers Ingram, business leader, philanthropist
Mena Suvari, actress
Lisa Sanders (Class of 1973), physician, medical author, and journalist
Frederica Mathewes-Green, Orthodox Christian author

Legends
Charleston legend has it that George Trenholm, a resident of the McBee House, the mansion on the school property, was the man on whom Margaret Mitchell based the character Rhett Butler in her novel, Gone with the Wind.

References

External links
Ashley Hall website
Ashley Hall Summer Camp Registration
Article about Ashley Hall from The State

Private elementary schools in South Carolina
Private high schools in South Carolina
Private middle schools in South Carolina
Educational institutions established in 1909
Schools in Charleston County, South Carolina
Education in Charleston, South Carolina
Preparatory schools in South Carolina
1909 establishments in South Carolina